The 1925–26 Cornell Big Red men's ice hockey season was the 21st season of play for the program. The teams was coached by Nick Bawlf in his 6th season.

Season
The Big Red began practicing in mid December with six games on their slate. In spite of the unpredictable nature of the weather, most of Cornell's game were scheduled to take place at Ithaca. With captain Tilton and Edminster forming the backbone of the team, the roster was compiled in early January and many of the players were familiar faces. One new arrival came in goal, Nash, necessitated by last year's starter having graduated. The team performed well in their first game with Tilton earning the game-winner with less than 3 minutes remaining.

There was considerable improvement in the team over the course of the following week, but their next opponent, Dartmouth was a very strong outfit. The Indians ended up proving that with a 12–1 demolition, including 6 goals in the first. Tilton's goal was one of the few bright lights for the squad and, despite the score, Nash was credited with solid play in net. The next game for the team was much closer but still resulted in a loss. Boston University kept the Big Red from scoring a single goal and recorded their only tally of the game in the waning minutes. The defeat left a foul taste in the team's mouth over the examination break and they were champing at the bit by early February.

Williams was next and coach Bawlf made several changed to the lineup. Ayers, a new entry, was put in as a starter on defense while Hoyt, now eligible in the new term, replaced Cooke at Left Wing. The new arrangement saw Cornell produce its biggest offensive output but the Ephs were able to use a fast start to say ahead of the Ithacans and win the match. The team continued its run of 1-goal losses against Princeton before finally winning its second game of the season to end the year. The final match was the first between Cornell and nearby Syracuse University on the ice and the Big Red earned their first shutout in over 3 years.

Tilton led the team with 7 goals.

Roster

Standings

Schedule and Results

|-
!colspan=12 style=";" | Regular Season

References

Cornell Big Red men's ice hockey seasons
Cornell
Cornell
Cornell
Cornell